Sky Hopinka (born 1984) is a Native American visual artist and filmmaker who is a member of the Ho-Chunk Nation and a descendant of the Pechanga Band of Luiseño people. Hopinka was awarded a MacArthur Foundation Grant in 2022.

Early life and education 
Hopinka was born in Ferndale, Washington, and moved to Southern California as a teenager.

Hopinka's undergraduate education was at Portland State University (PSU), where he became interested in documentary film. He received a Bachelor of Arts in liberal arts. While at PSU, he started to take interest in Indigenous language revitalization.

In 2013 he moved to Milwaukee, Wisconsin, the homeland of the Ho-Chunk Nation, and enrolled at the University of Wisconsin-Milwaukee where he received a Master of Fine Arts degree in film, video, and new genres.

Career
Hopinka's work deals with personal interpretations of homeland and landscape; the correlation between language and culture in relation to home and land. Hopinka has said: “Deconstructing language [through cinema] is a way for me to be free from the dogma of traditional storytelling and then, from there, to explore or propose more of what Indigenous cinema has the possibility to look like.”

His film and video work has been featured at Media City Film Festival, the Museum of Modern Art, New York, the Walker Art Center, the Tate Modern, the Whitney Biennial, Hessel Museum of Art at Bard College, Sundance Film Festival, ImagineNATIVE Film and Media Arts Festival, Toronto International Film Festival, Ann Arbor Film Festival, New York Film Festival, among others.

Hopinka organized a film program called What Was Always Yours and Never Lost focused on Indigenous experimental cinema. The film series began in 2016 and was later shown at the 2019 Whitney Biennial.

Teaching
Hopinka is former associate professor at Simon Fraser University in British Columbia, where he taught film, video, and animation. He is currently Assistant Professor of Film and Electronic Arts at Bard. He has also taught Chinuk Wawa, the indigenous language of the Lower Columbia River Basin.

Awards and honors
 2022, MacArthur Foundation "Genius" Grant
 2021, residency fellowship, Forge Project, Taghkanic, N.Y.

 2020, John Simon Guggenheim Foundation fellowship
 2020, MacDowell (artists' residency and workshop) fellowship
 2019, Media City Film Festival's Chrysalis Fellowship to work on post-production of małni—towards the ocean, towards the shore (2020)
2018–19, Radcliffe Institute for Advanced Study at Harvard University fellowship to work on to post-production work on a feature-length experimental film, titled Imał. This film has been described as "wandering through a neomythological approach to explore an Indigenous presence of language and culture in the Pacific Northwest".
 2017, Mary L. Nohl Fund Fellowship, 2017
 2016, More with Less Award, Images Festival
2015, Third Prize, Media City Film Festival 
 2015, Tom Berman Award for Most Promising Filmmaker, Ann Arbor Film Festival

Collections 
 Whitney Museum of American Art, New York City, New York
 Museum of Modern Art, New York City, New York
 Memorial Art Gallery, Rochester, New York

References

Native American artists
Native American filmmakers
1984 births
American video artists
Living people
MacDowell Colony fellows
University of Wisconsin–Milwaukee alumni
Ho-Chunk Nation of Wisconsin people
20th-century American artists
21st-century American artists
American male artists
Native American male artists
People from Ferndale, Washington
Portland State University alumni
Filmmakers from Washington (state)
Luiseño people
21st-century American educators
20th-century Native Americans
21st-century Native Americans
20th-century American male artists